This list of railway museums in Germany shows those locations where a heritage railway or tramway is operated or a railway museum or streetcar museum exists. The name of the operating company is given where known.

Germany

Baden-Württemberg 
Sinsheim Auto & Technik Museum, Sinsheim, Baden-Württemberg
South German Railway Museum, Heilbronn, Baden-Württemberg

Baden 

Achern–Ottenhöfen im Schwarzwald: Acher Valley Railway (Achertäler Bahnverein e. V.)
Blumberg–Weizen: Wutach Valley Railway
Ettlingen–Bad Herrenalb: Alb Valley Railway (Ulmer Eisenbahnfreunde)
Crailsheim: DBK Historic Railway
Gaildorf–Sulzbach-Laufen Upper Kocher Valley Railway (DBK Historic Railway)
Stuttgart: Railway Vehicle Preservation Society ( or GES)
Haltingen–Kandern Kander Valley Railway (Kandertalbahn)
Wiesloch Feldbahn and Industrial Museum
Stuttgart Straßenbahn Museum Zuffenhausen

Württemberg 
 Amstetten–Gerstetten railway (Lokalbahn Amstetten–Gerstetten, Ulmer Eisenbahnfreunde)
 Amstetten–Oppingen (Albbähnle), Ulmer Eisenbahnfreunde - Little Alb Railway
 Jagsttalbahn Möckmühl–Dörzbach - Jagst Valley Railway
 Schorndorf–Rudersberg (Wieslauftalbahn, in short: Wiesel) - Wieslauf Valley Railway
 Sigmaringen–Hechingen/–Münsingen
 Zollernbahn Railway Society, Rottweil, (Eisenbahnfreunde Zollernbahn)
 Nürtingen–Neuffen (Tälesbahn) - Täles Railway
 Warthausen–Ochsenhausen (Öchsle)
 Korntal–Weissach (Strohgäubahn) - Strohgäu Railway
 Trossinger Eisenbahn - Trossingen Railway
 Härtsfeld Museum Railway, Neresheim - Härtsfeld Railway
Ulmer Eisenbahnfreunde, Ulm

Bavaria

Franconia 
Mellrichstadt–Fladungen (Rhön-Zügle) - Little Rhön Train
Seligenstadt b. Wü.–Volkach (Mainschleifenbahn) - Mainschleifen Railway
Ebermannstadt–Gößweinstein–Behringersmühle (Dampfbahn Fränkische Schweiz) - Franconian Switzerland Steam Railway
DB Museum, Nuremberg
Franconian Museum Railway, Nuremberg (Fränkische Museums-Eisenbahn)
Neuenmarkt–Wirsberg (German Steam Locomotive Museum)
Nuremberg Transport Museum, Nuremberg
Steinwiesen–Nordhalben (Rodachtalbahn) - Rodach Valley Railway

Old Bavaria 
Bavarian Localbahn Society, Bayerisch Eisenstein
Viechtach–Gotteszell
Prien–Prien-Stock (Chiemsee-Bahn) - Chiemsee Railway
Bad Endorf–Obing (Chiemgauer Lokalbahn) - Chiemsee Branch Line
Kiefersfelden–Wachtl (Tirol) (Wachtl-Express) - Wachtl Express
Eggmühl–Langquaid (Laabertalbahn) - Laaber Valley Railway
Freilassing Locomotive World, Freilassing
Deutsches Museum, Munich
Munich Steam Locomotive Company, Munich

Swabia 
Augsburg Railway Park, Augsburg
Bavarian Railway Museum, Nördlingen
Nördlingen–Nördlingen–Feuchtwangen (Bavarian Railway Museum, Nördlingen)
Nördlingen–Gunzenhausen (Bavarian Railway Museum, Nördlingen)
(Augsburg–)Gessertshausen–Langenneufnach–Markt Wald (Staudenbahn) - Stauden Railway

Berlin 
German Museum of Technology (Berlin)
Berlin-Rosenthal]–Basdorf–Schmachtenhagen (Heidekrautbahn) - Heidekraut Railway
AG Märkische Kleinbahn in Schönow - Märkisch Railway
Britzer Museumseisenbahn - Britz Museum Railway

Brandenburg 
Mesendorf–Brünkendorf–Vettin/–Lindenberg junction
Finsterwalde Frankenaer Weg-Finsterwalde Ponnsdorfer Weg-Möllendorf-Breitenau-Kleinbahren-Crinitz Töpfermarkt-Crinitz station (Niederlausitzer Museumseisenbahn) - Niederlausitz Museum Railway
 Buckower Kleinbahn (Electric Kleinbahn (minor line) on the Buckow (Märkische Schweiz)–Waldsieversdorf–Müncheberg / Mark route) - Buckow Branch Line

Bremen 
'Das Depot' museum  and museum tram lines 15 and 16 (Freunde der Bremer Straßenbahn)
Bremerhaven-Bad Bederkesa
Bremen–Thedinghausen Railway

Hamburg 
Bergedorf–Geesthacht–Krümmel, Arbeitsgemeinschaft Geesthachter Eisenbahn - Geesthacht Railway Working Group

Hesse 

Schwalmstadt–Homberg/–Oberaula (Eisenbahnfreunde Schwalm-Knüll)
Wiesbaden–Hohenstein (Aartalbahn or Nassau Tourist Railway)
Bad Schwalbacher Kurbahn - Bad Schwalbach Spa Railway
Bad Nauheim–Münzenberg (formerly Butzbach-Licher Eisenbahn, Eisenbahnfreunde Wetterau)
Darmstadt-Kranichstein Railway Museum, Darmstadt
Darmstadt Ost–Bessunger Forst
Darmstadt–Roßdorf
Darmstadt/Eberstadt–Alsbach
Darmstadt/Schloss–Griesheim
Frankfurt City Junction Line, Frankfurt
Frankfurt port railway (Historic Railway, Frankfurt)
Frankfurter Feldbahnmuseum - Frankfurt Feldbahn Museum
Feld- und Grubenbahnmuseum Fortuna - Fortuna Feldbahn and Mining Railway Museum
Historic Railway, Frankfurt, Frankfurt
Kassel–Naumburg (Hessencourrier)
Dampfkleinbahn Bad Orb - Bad Orb Branch Line

Mecklenburg-West Pomerania 
Grevesmühlen–Klütz
Schwichtenberg–Uhlenhorst (Mecklenburg-Pommersche Schmalspurbahn) - Mecklenburg-Pomeranian Narrow Gauge Railway
Neubrandenburg–Friedland

Lower Saxony

West of the Weser 
Spiekeroog (Museum wagonway) - Spiekerooge Island Railway
Borkum Reede–Borkum (Borkumer Kleinbahn, Museum open in summer) - Borkum Branch Line
Norden–Dornum (Museumseisenbahn Küstenbahn Ostfriesland) - Ostfriesland Coastal Railway
Meppen–Haselünne–Herzlake–Löningen, Meppen-Haselünner Eisenbahn (Eisenbahnfreunde Hasetal) Meppen-Haselünne Railway
Westerstede–Sedelsberg (Museumseisenbahn Ammerland-Saterland) - Ammerland-Saterland Museum Railway
Delmenhorst–Harpstedt ("Jan Harpstedt", Delmenhorst-Harpstedter Eisenbahnfreunde)
Friesoythe–Garrel–Cloppenburg
Bremen-Thedinghausen Railway (Kleinbahn Leeste) - Leeste Branch Line
Deutscher Eisenbahn-Verein (German Railway Society), Bruchhausen-Vilsen–Asendorf
Syke–Bruchhausen-Vilsen–Hoya–Eystrup (first and oldest museum railway in Germany: German Railway Society, 1964), Kaffkieker
Osnabrück-Piesberg Mine station (Osnabrücker Dampflokfreunde)
Preußisch-Oldendorf–Bohmte (Wittlager Kreisbahn, Minden Museum Railway) - Wittlage District Railway

East of the Weser 
Moorbahn Burgsittensen - Burgsittensen Moor Railway
Deinste–Lütjenkamp (b. Stade)
Tostedt–Zeven–Wilstedt
Bad Bederkesa–Bremerhaven
Bremervörde–Gnarrenburg–Worpswede–Osterholz-Scharmbeck (Moorexpress) - Moor Express
Buxtehude–Harsefeld
Verden (Aller)–Kirchlinteln-Stemmen: Verdener Eisenbahnfreunde Kleinbahn Verden-Walsrode - Verden-Walsrode Railway
Soltau–Bispingen–Winsen (Luhe)/–Lüneburg–Bleckede (Heide Express)
Soltau–Bergen–Celle/–Munster (including Heide Express)
Celle–Wittingen (including Heide Express)

Eastphalia (Southeast Lower Saxony) 
Sehnde, Hanover,  (Hannoversches Straßenbahn-Museum) - Hanover Tramway Museum
Uchte–Rahden
Stadthagen–Bad Eilsen–Rinteln (Dampfeisenbahn Weserbergland) - Weser Uplands Steam Railway
Rinteln–Barntrup
Helmstedt–Weferlingen (Ostfalenkurier)
Duingen–Bad Salzdetfurth–Bodenburg
Salzgitter–Börßum
Emmerthal–Bodenwerder–Vorwohle
Kreiensen–Kalefeld
Wunstorf–Bokeloh–Mesmerode (Steinhuder Meer-Bahn) - Steinhude Lake Railway
Almstedt–Segeste (Arbeitsgemeinschaft historische Eisenbahn) - Historic Railway Working Group

Mecklenburg-Western Pomerania 
Rügen Railway & Technology Museum, Prora

North Rhine-Westphalia

Westphalia 

Osnabrück–Mettingen-Rheine (Tecklenburger Nordbahn, Osnadampf) - Tecklenburg Northern Railway
Bocholt–Mussum (Euregio Eisenbahn Ahaus-Alstätte)
Bochum Dahlhausen Railway Museum, Bochum
Bochum-Dahlhausen–Hagen Hauptbahnhof–Ennepetal-Altenvoerde (Bochum-Dahlhausen Railway Museum, Ruhrtal-Bahn) - Ruhr Valley Railway
Witten (Gruben- und Feldbahnmuseum Theresia) - Theresia Feldbahn and Mining Railway Museum
Hamm–Lippborg (Museumseisenbahn Hamm) - Hamm Museum Railway
Rheda-Wiedenbrück–Langenberg (Operations planned) (Westfälische Localbahn) - Westphalian Branchl Line
Hövelhof–Gütersloh Nord–Ibbenbüren
Gütersloh, Dampf-Kleinbahn Mühlenstroth
Halle (Westfalen)-Bielefeld ("Haller Willem")
Hille–Minden–Kleinenbremen (Mindener Museumseisenbahn)
Rahden–Uchte (Mindener Museumseisenbahn)
Barntrup–Rinteln Süd (Lippische Landeseisenbahn) - Lippe State Railway
Büren (Westfalen)–Brilon (Waldbahn Almetal)
Herscheid-Hüinghausen–Plettenberg-Köbbinghauser Hammer (Sauerländer Kleinbahn) - Sauerland Branch Line
Coesfeld-Lette (Technisches Eisenbahnmuseum Alter Bahnhof Lette (Kr Coesfeld))
Erkrath (Eisenbahnmuseum Lokschuppen Hochdahl) - Lokschuppen Hochdahl Railway Museum
Metelen (Eisenbahnmuseum Metelen Land) - Metelen State Railway Museum
Münster (Westfälisches Eisenbahnmuseum Münster) - Westphalian Railway Museum, Münster

Rhineland 
Dieringhausen Railway Museum, Dieringhausen, Gummersbach (Eisenbahnmuseum Dieringhausen)
Geilenkirchen–Gillrath–Schierwaldenrath–Gangelt (Interessengemeinschaft Historischer Schienenverkehr, Selfkantbahn) - Selfkant Railway
Moers–Neukirchen-Vluyn–Rheurdt (Closed 2001, from 2007 occasional excursions in the Moers–Neukirchen-Vluyn area by the Niederrheinische Verkehrsbetriebe)
Moers-Orsoy]-Rheinberg (Niederrheinische Verkehrsbetriebe)
Tönisvorst–Krefeld–Hülser Berg (Schluff, Stadtwerke Krefeld)
Essen-Kupferdreh–Essen-Werden (Hespertalbahn) - Hespe Valley Railway
Wuppertal–Bergisches Straßenbahnmuseum (Bergische Museumsbahn) - Bergisch Museum Railway
Köln-Dellbrück (Straßenbahnmuseum Köln-Thielenbruch) - Cologne-Thielenbruch Tramway Museum
Köln-Nippes (Rheinisches Industriebahn-Museum (RIM)) - Rhine Industrial Museum
Wesseling (Eisenbahn-Museum der Köln-Bonner Eisenbahn-Freunde) - Railway Museum of the Cologne-Bonn Railway Society
Siegen (Südwestfälisches Eisenbahnmuseum Siegen) - South Westphalian Railway Museum
Kall–Schleiden (Oleftalbahn) - Olef Valley Railway

Rhineland-Palatinate 
Betzdorf–Steinebach/Sieg
Hermeskeil–Nonnweiler
Bahnbetriebswerk Hermeskeil, Hermeskeil
Neustadt/Weinstraße Railway Museum, Neustadt an der Weinstrasse
Neustadt an der Weinstraße–Elmstein (Kuckucksbähnel) - Cuckoo Railway
Gerolstein–Kaisersesch (Eifelquerbahn) - Pan-Eifel Railway
Kasbachtalbahn (Linz/Rhein−Kalenborn) - Kasbach Valley Railway
Brohltalbahn - Brohl Valley Railway
Technik Museum Speyer, Speyer

Saarland 
 Merzig–Nunkirchen–Losheim (Merzig-Büschfelder Eisenbahn operated by Museums-Eisenbahnclub-Losheim) - Merzig-Büschfeld Railway
Ottweiler–Schwarzerden bei Freisen (Ostertalbahn) - Oster Valley Railway

Saxony 
Dresden Transport Museum, Dresden
Weißwasser–Bad Muskau (Waldeisenbahn Muskau)  gauge - Muskau Forest Railway
Freital–Kurort Kipsdorf (Weißeritztalbahn)  gauge - Weisseritz Valley Railway
Zittau–Oybin/Jonsdorf (Zittauer Schmalspurbahnen)  gauge - Zittau Narrow Gauge Railways
Cranzahl–Oberwiesenthal (Fichtelbergbahn)  gauge - Fichtelberg Railway
Steinbach–Jöhstadt (Preßnitztalbahn)  gauge - Pressnitz Valley Railway
Oschatz–Mügeln–Kemmlitz ("Wild Robert" Döllnitzbahn)  gauge - Döllnitz Railway
Radebeul–Moritzburg–Radeburg (Lößnitzgrundbahn)  gauge Lössnitz Valley Railway
Freital (:de:Windbergbahn)  gauge (standard gauge) - Windberg Railway
Schönheide–Stützengrün (Museumsbahn Schönheide)  gauge  - Schönheide Museum Railway
Saxon Railway Museum, Chemnitz
Museumsfeldbahn Leipzig-Lindenau e.V. - Leipzig
Eisenbahnmuseum Leipzig - Leipzig

Saxony-Anhalt 
Möckern–Altengrabow
Wernigerode–Drei-Annen-Hohne–Nordhausen/–Brocken (Harzquerbahn/Brockenbahn) - Pan-Harz Railway and Brocken Railway
Quedlinburg-Gernrode–Alexisbad–Stiege–Hasselfelde/–Eisfelder Talmühle und Alexisbad–Harzgerode (Selketalbahn) - Selke Valley Railway
Hettstedt–Klostermansfeld (Mansfelder Bergwerksbahn) - Mansfeld Mining Railway
Dessau–Wörlitz (Dessau-Wörlitzer Eisenbahn) - Dessau-Wörlitz Railway
Traditionsbetriebswerk Staßfurt, Stassfurt

Schleswig-Holstein 
Kappeln–Süderbrarup (Angeln-Bahn) - Angeln Railway
Kiel–Schönberg (Holstein) (Verein Verkehrsamateure und Museumsbahn) - Kiel–Schönberg Railway
Schönberg (Holstein)–Schönberger Strand (Verein Verkehrsamateure und Museumsbahn)
Bergedorf–Geesthacht–Krümmel
Malente-Gremsmühlen–Lütjenburg railway

Thuringia 
Ilmenau–Schleusingen (Rennsteigbahn) - Rennsteig Railway
Oberweißbacher Bergbahn - Oberweissbach Mountain Railway

See also 
 List of railway museums
 Narrow gauge railway
 Feldbahn
 History of rail transport in Germany

External links 
 www.eisenbahnnostalgie.de - List of German museum and heritage railways
 Guide to museum railways in Baden (Museumsbahnen-Fahrplan Baden)
 Museum railways in Bavaria
 German Museum and Heritage Railway Union

 
 
Mus
Germany